Would You Believe is an album by Billy Nicholls released in 1968.

Billy Nicholls was originally hired by Andrew Loog Oldham as a staff writer for Oldham's Immediate Records. Oldham was so entranced by the Beach Boys' 1966 album, Pet Sounds that he enlisted songwriter Billy Nicholls to record a British response, which became this largely forgotten album. The Small Faces' Steve Marriott can be heard very prominently on "Would You Believe?," despite Oldham's attempts to drown him out with heavy orchestration. Oldham wanted this to be the British Pet Sounds but financial difficulties with the label caused it to be shelved (it only achieved an initial promotional run of 100 copies, as Immediate IMCP009) before it ever hit the streets.

In 1998, Nicholls re-released it on his own label Southwest Records. It was made more widely available on Sequel Castle Communications (CMQDD1358) records in 1999. Several Sequel/Castle editions have been released since, including a version containing demos from the 60s, also originally first released as Snapshot on Southwest Records in 2000.

Other artists recorded versions of Billy Nicholls' songs from Would You Believe. Like Nicholls, Andrew Loog Oldham also produced the 1967 Del Shannon LP Home and Away. This LP was also unissued at the time. It has been reissued in multiple formats since 1978, first called And The Music Plays On and later as Home and Away on CD. Nicholls' songs also appeared on Dana Gillespie's LP Foolish Seasons, first released in 1968 and later reissued on CD.

Would You Believe was selected for The MOJO Collection as one of the most significant albums in musical history.

Original track listing
All tracks composed by Billy Nicholls; except where indicated
 "Would You Believe?" (Jeremy Paul) - 2:41
 "Come Again" - 2:34
 "Life Is Short" - 3:07
 "Feeling Easy" - 3:12
 "Daytime Girl" - 2:14
 "Daytime Girl (Coda)" - 1:36
 "London Social Degree" - 2:20
 "Portobello Road" - 2:05
 "Question Mark" - 2:26
 "Being Happy" - 2:28
 "Girl From New York" - 3:16
 "It Brings Me Down" - 4:39

Personnel
Billy Nicholls - vocals, acoustic guitar, background vocals
Joe Moretti - electric guitar
Steve Marriott - electric guitar, background vocals
Big Jim Sullivan - acoustic guitar
John Paul Jones - bass
Ronnie Lane - bass, background vocals
Jerry Shirley, Kenney Jones - drums
Nicky Hopkins, Ian McLagan, Caleb Quaye - keyboards
Barry Husband, Denny Gerrard - background vocals
Arthur Greenslade, John Paul Jones - arrangements; except "Would You Believe?" arranged by The Small Faces
Alan O'Duffy - recording engineer for "Would You Believe?"

See also
No Introduction Necessary

References

External links
 www.musthear.com review

1968 debut albums
Albums arranged by Arthur Greenslade
Albums arranged by John Paul Jones (musician)
Albums produced by Andrew Loog Oldham
Albums recorded at IBC Studios
Albums recorded at Olympic Sound Studios
Immediate Records albums